The Asian Cross Country Championships is a biennial regional cross country running competition for athletes from Asia. It is organised by the Asian Athletics Association and was first held in 1991 in Fukuoka, Japan. The competition has been held every two years since then, although the 2003 edition was postponed due to political conflicts within the region.

The championships comprises four races: separate senior races for men and for women, and two corresponding junior races for the sexes. Furthermore, in each of the four races athletes compete simultaneously for both individual medals and team medals. For the team competitions, the final positions of the best finishing runners from each country are combined and the team with the lowest points total wins.

Athletes and teams of Japan, China and Iran have historically been the most successful of the championships. However, Qatar and Bahrain have become increasingly dominant since 2005, led by a number of East African-born athletes who have transferred allegiance to the small Middle-Eastern states.

The 2011 edition, set for February in Kathmandu, was postponed after the Nepalese government did not provide the requisite funds needed to host the event. China took over the hosting rights and held the 11th edition the following year in Qingzhen.

The 2020 edition of the race, originally set for March in Hong Kong, was postponed due to the coronavirus pandemic.

Editions

Champions
http://www.gbrathletics.com/ic/cxc.htm#AS

Senior

Junior

All time medal table
As 2018

References
General
Hubbeling, Heinrich & Krishnan, Ram Murali (2009-03-09). Asian Crosscountry Championships. Association of Road Racing Statisticians. Retrieved on 2010-02-23.
Specific

External links
 Asian Athletics Association website
 Results
 http://www.gbrathletics.com/ic/cxc.htm#AS

 
Cross country running competitions
Cross country
Cross Country
Athletics team events
Continental athletics championships
Biennial athletics competitions